The Loves of Ariane is a 1931 British-German drama film directed by Paul Czinner starring Elisabeth Bergner, Charles Carson and Percy Marmont. Shot in Germany, it was an English-language version of the 1931 film Ariane. It was based on the 1920 novel Ariane, jeune fille russe by Claude Anet. The screenplay concerns a young woman studying at University who falls in love with Don Juan.  A German version of the film, Ariane was also made.

Cast
 Elisabeth Bergner as  Ariane
 Percy Marmont as Anthony Fraser
 Warwick Ward as Doctor
 Charles Carson as Professor
 Joan Matheson as Olga
 Oriel Ross as Duchess
 Elizabeth Vaughan as Waravara

References

Bibliography
 Wood, Linda. British Films, 1927-1939. British Film Institute, 1986.

External links

1931 films
Films directed by Paul Czinner
1931 drama films
British drama films
German drama films
Films based on French novels
Films based on romance novels
British multilingual films
German multilingual films
British black-and-white films
German black-and-white films
Films with screenplays by Carl Mayer
Films with screenplays by Paul Czinner
1931 multilingual films
1930s English-language films
1930s British films
1930s German films
Films set in Berlin